Ariel Mace Solomon (born July 16, 1968) is a former professional American football offensive lineman who played 61 games over six seasons for the Pittsburgh Steelers and the Minnesota Vikings.

Solomon is Jewish.

References

1968 births
Living people
Sportspeople from Brooklyn
Players of American football from New York City
Sportspeople from Boulder, Colorado
Players of American football from Colorado
American football offensive guards
American football offensive tackles
Colorado Buffaloes football players
Pittsburgh Steelers players
Minnesota Vikings players
Jewish American sportspeople
21st-century American Jews